The Little Drummer Girl is a British television drama based on the 1983 novel of the same name by John le Carré and first aired on BBC One in the United Kingdom on 28 October 2018 and on AMC in the United States during November 2018.

Premise
In 1979, an aspiring English actress is recruited by Mossad to infiltrate a Palestinian group plotting terrorism in Europe.

Cast

Episodes

Reception 
On review aggregator website Rotten Tomatoes, the series holds an approval rating of 95% based on 75 reviews, with an average rating of 7.8/10. The critics' consensus reads "The Little Drummer Girl marches to a steady beat of assured plotting, extraordinary art direction, and a uniformly terrific cast that makes the show's smolderingly slow burn pace bearable." On Metacritic, it has a weighted average score of 75 out of 100 based on 18 reviews, signifying "generally favorable reviews".

Richard Lawson of Vanity Fair praised Florence Pugh's acting but criticized elements of the story.
Alan Sepinwell of Rolling Stone awarded The Little Drummer Girl 3.5 out of five stars, praising the acting and lush presentation but criticizing what he regarded as the show's "convoluted" story. He observed that it followed the formula of the critically acclaimed The Night Manager television series, an adaptation of another one of Le Carré's novels. Judy Berman, reviewing for TIME, praised the TV series for its suspense, exploring moral dilemmas and the legacy of British foreign policy in the Middle East, and for having nuanced characters on both sides.

Troy Patterson of The New Yorker described the series as a "subtly nutty geopolitical thriller distilled to an exercise in psychological suspense". He also praised Florence Pugh, Alexander Skarsgård, and Michael Shannon's performances as the main protagonists Charlie Ross, Gadi Becker, and Martin Kurtz. Matt Zoller Seitz of Vulture described the series as "a lavishly produced, intelligent, tasteful mixed bag, more interesting to think about than to watch." Jesse Schedeen of IGN awarded the series 8.2 out of 10, praising Pugh's "mesmerizing" performance and Park Chan-Wook's strong directorial vision for overcoming its storytelling flaws.

References

External links
 
 
 The Little Drummer Girl  on Rotten Tomatoes, Flixster Inc.

2018 British television series debuts
2018 British television series endings
2010s British drama television series
2010s British television miniseries
Espionage television series
AMC (TV channel) original programming
BBC television dramas
John le Carré
Television shows based on British novels
English-language television shows
Television series set in 1979
Television series set in the 1970s
Television shows set in Bavaria
Television shows set in Cologne
Television shows set in Germany
Television shows set in Greece
Television shows set in Israel
Television shows set in Lebanon
Television shows set in London
Television shows set in Munich
Television shows set in North Rhine-Westphalia
Television shows set in Turkey
Television series by BBC Studios